The city of Thrissur, the cultural capital of Kerala, is also a major commercial and business hub of South India. It is said to be the heartland of Kerala's business acumen and home to most every leading Malayali entrepreneurs. The city which is famous for Bullion, Banking and its Business acumen, is the darling of investors in Kerala. Thrissur is also referred as the Golden city of India. It manufactures 70% of plain gold jewellery in Kerala per day. According to a survey, Thrissur city has been placed on 7th among the ten cities in India to reside. According to Registrar of Companies, the period from 1 January to 31 March 2010, 87 companies were registered in Thrissur and stood second in Kerala after Cochin. Thrissur's traditional strength lies in best entrepreneurial and financial capabilities.

History
Historians say that King of Cochin, Sakthan Thampuran, invited 52 Syrian Christian families from the neighboring areas
, established them at oottupura or mass feeding centers and encouraged them to do business in textiles. The industries of Thrissur contribute largely to the district's and city's economy. The presence of leading industrial houses in Thrissur has boosted the industrial scenario of the area. Though, the city has numerous types of industries in Thrissur.

Economy of Thrissur

The economy of Thrissur is largely dependent on industries, retailing and financing. Thrissur is one of the most important industrial centers of the state of Kerala. Industries like textile, timber, coir, fishery industries, agriculture-based industries, tiles industries are present in Thrissur. However, the above-mentioned industries are not the only sources of revenue for Thrissur. The tourism industry plays an important role in Thrissur's economy.

Retailing

As Kerala is known more as a consumer state rather than a producer state, Thrissur also carries the same tag, as retailing is a big business and revenue earner for the City. Jewellery and textile retailing occupies a major part of the retailing business in Thrissur. The City is considered as hub of jewellery and textile business in South India. Kalyan Group, Kalyan Silks, Kalyan Jewellers, Pulimoottil Silks,Chakola Silkhouse, Elite Fabrics, Elite Sareee House, Manshire,Fashion Fabrics , Jos Alukka & Sons, Joyalukkas, Josco Group, Chemmanur Group are the few to name.

Tile industry
One of the significant industries of the area, the tile industry of Thrissur employs numerous labors from the state and outside. The Thrissur tile industry is more than a hundred years old. Over the years the tile industry in Thrissur has witnessed many rise and fall but it has managed to withstand the bad times. Today, Thrissur can boast of 160 tile factories making it one of the biggest hubs of southern India. The tile industry of Thrissur is aided by the presence of clay suitable for making tiles. The main centers of Tile Industry in Thrissur are in Karuvannur, Pudukad, Ollur and Amballur. The tile industry has acquired Italian technology to improve the quality and production of tiles. The tile industry provides many jobs to the local people of the city.

Banking and Finance

The main strength of Thrissur's economy is its financial capabilities. The banking system in Thrissur have been accredited for the effective disbursement of credit to the various sectors of the Kerala society. It had played a big role in Kerala's economy from the earlier part of 1800s. It was started by Christian traders in the form of Chit fund. Gradually, Chit fund contributed much to the development of the banking industry in Thrissur.
 Now, Thrissur boast the headquarters of four scheduled banks in Kerala, South Indian Bank Ltd, Catholic Syrian Bank,  Dhanalakshmi Bank and ESAF Small Finance Bank. The city also is the headquarters of Manappuram General Finance and Leasing Ltd and Kerala State Financial Enterprise. According to All Kerala Kuri Foreman's Association, Kerala has around 5,000 chit companies, with Thrissur accounting for the maximum of 3,000. These chit companies provide employment to about 35,000 persons directly and an equal number indirectly.

Following are the list of banks based in Thrissur.

Ayurvedic drug manufacturing industry

. Thrissur Ayurveda Cluster, another initiative by a group of ayurvedic manufacturers of Thrissur, has developed a cluster in KINFRA Park in Koratty in Thrissur District. The cluster is meant for a comprehensive development of Kerala brand of ayurvedic products and train the manufacturers of ayurveda products. The cluster have facilities for testing and analysis, process product validation, safety study and manufacture. The cluster is approved by the Department of Ayurveda, Yoga & Naturopathy, Unani, Siddha and Homoeopathy (AYUSH).

Textile industry
The prosperous textile mills have made the textile industry of Thrissur a leading industry in South India. At present, there are six such mills in Thrissur. The textile mills in Thrissur are Sitaram Spinning and Weaving Mills; Alagappa Textiles, Alagappa Nagar; Kerala Lakshmi Mills, Pullazhi; Cotton Mills, Nattika; Rajgopal Textiles, Athani; Kunnath Textiles and Vanaja Textiles in Kuriachira. Mainly hosiery products are manufactured in most of these mills. Thrissur is one of the leading producer of hosiery end products in the Kerala. Popular as sewing threads, Vaiga is sold in every corner of the country. The first mill in Thrissur was the Sitaram Spinning and Weaving Mills. It was established in 1909 but was devastated by fire in 1953. However, it was soon reorganized and today it is one of the main textile plants of the area.

Gold
.

Thrissur city can also be referred as the Gold Capital of India, since there is around Rs 700 crore business of gold every year in the city. All major jewelleries in Kerala have branches in city. It is one of the main manufacturing centers of plain gold jewellery in the South India. 70% of Kerala's jewellery is manufactured in this city. Gold jewellery in Thrissur is well known for its world class craftsmanship and exquisite dexterity.

Diamond industry
Thrissur is known as the hub of diamond and gold jewellery production in South India. Majority of the units located in Kapiparambu, Tholur, Adat, Choondal and Avanur in the Thrissur Metropolitan Area. There are around 75 units employing around 5,000 people. The diamond polishing work was brought to Kerala by P K Sankunni in 1964 from Mumbai. Because of higher wages and less encouragement from Kerala government, most of the traders are relocating to Surat in Gujarat. At the height of the business there were 310 units and around 25,000 workers were involved in this business.

Thrissur Pooram
 According to estimates, around a million people around the world witness the annual Thrissur Pooram. The two main participants of the 36-hour festival, Thiruvambadi and Paramekkavu temples, spend about Rs 1.2 crore on the festival. Hotels and flats in the city give rooms and terraces for people to witness the festival on rent, charging Rs 750-1,000 per person. Liquor sales, too, see an increase during the festival. Sales through the various liquor shops and bars in the Thrissur city were worth around Rs 72 lakh on the Pooram day alone in 2008, according to officials of Kerala State Beverages Corporation, the government-owned liquor retailer in the state.

Real Estate
Real estate is one of the sunshine sectors of city of Thrissur's economy. Land availability, image of a clean and green city, good law and order situation, presence of reputed educational institutions and tremendous scope for promoting tourism industry are the pillars of Thrissur's real estate hopes. With Kochi becoming more and more congested day-by-day, in due course of time the city of Thrissur is expected to see a spurt in the number of property buyers.

Leading property developers like Sanroyal Builders, Kalyan Developers, Hi-Life Builders, Southern Investments,  Thrissur Builders, Cheloor Group, Sreeramajayam Builders, Jos Alukkas Group & Developers, Maya Realtors, Skyline Builders and Sobha Developers Ltd are the major players.

Kuries
Thrissur is also known for its Kuries or Chit companies. Around 2,000 such companies are located in Thrissur city, both government and private. These Kuri companies have played a major role in developing Thrissur city into an economic hub in South India.

References